Four freestyle skiing events were held at the 2002 Winter Olympics in Salt Lake City, at the venue in Deer Valley.  There were both men's and women's competition in both aerials and moguls events.  In moguls, the athletes ski down a slope littered with moguls (bumps), attempting to get down in as fast a time as possible while also attempting to get points for technique and their two aerial jumps during the course.  The aerials events consisted of two jumps, which were judged by air, form and landing.

Medal summary

Medal table

Men’s events

Women’s events

Participating NOCs
Twenty-one nations competed in the freestyle skiing events at Salt Lake City.

References

External links
Freestyle Skiing History: Olympics 1988-2002 
Results Book – Freestyle skiing

 
2002 in freestyle skiing
2002 Winter Olympics events
2002